François Chérèque (1 June 1956 – 2 January 2017) was a French Trade unionist, and leader of the French trade union CFDT (French Democratic Confederation of Labour or Confédération française démocratique du travail).

Early life
François Chérèque was born in Nancy department of Lorraine (region). His father, Jacques Chérèque, served as the vice-president of the CFDT. His brother, Marc Chérèque, went on to serve as the President, since 2005, of FC Grenoble. Another brother was vice-president from 2009 to 2011 of Amadeus IT Group.

Chérèque went to the Lycée Notre-Dame Saint-Sigisbert, leaving in 1975.

Career
Chérèque worked for a hospital in Puteaux in Paris, then worked at a hospital in Digne-les-Bains, in the Provence-Alpes-Côte d'Azur region of south-east France.

Chérèque was the leader (secrétaire général) of the CFDT from 2002 until 28 November 2012. He succeeded Nicole Notat. During his tenure, he negotiated in favour of pensions for public sector workers. He was succeeded by Laurent Berger.

Chérèque served as the president of PS Terra Nova, a think tank, from 2012 to 2016.

Death
Chérèque died of leukemia on 2 January 2017.

Works

 .

References

External links
 Biography 

1956 births
2017 deaths
People from Nancy, France
French Democratic Confederation of Labour members
Deaths from leukemia
Deaths from cancer in France
French trade union leaders